Fatherland Party is the name of several current or former political parties:

 Watan Party of Afghanistan
 Fatherland Party (Iran)
 Fatherland Party (Germany)
 Fatherland Party (Kazakhstan)
 Fatherland Party (Norway)
 Greeks for the Fatherland
 Fatherland - All Russia
 All-Ukrainian Union "Fatherland"

See also 
 Motherland Party (disambiguation)
 Fatherland Union (disambiguation)
 List of generic names of political parties